Zoysa or de Zoysa is a surname. Notable people with the surname include:

A. P. de Zoysa (1890-1968), Sri Lankan social reformer
Arthur de Zoysa, Ceylonese statesman
Cyril de Zoysa (1896-1978), Sri Lankan industrialist
Dinesh de Zoysa (born 1977), Sri Lankan cricketer
Felix R. de Zoysa, Sri Lankan businessman
Francis de Zoysa, Sri Lankan lawyer
Maduranga Zoysa (born 1984), Sri Lankan cricketer
M. P. de Zoysa, Sri Lankan politician
Nuwan Zoysa (born 1978), Sri Lankan cricketer
Richard de Zoysa (1958-1990), Sri Lankan journalist
Stanley de Zoysa, Sri Lankan politician
Sydney de Zoysa (1909-1994),  Sri Lankan police officer

Sinhalese surnames